The 1997 LEN European Aquatics Championships were held in Seville, Spain from Tuesday 19 August to Sunday 24 August, in the 50 m pool of the Centro Deportivo San Pablo. The 23rd edition of the event was organised by the LEN. Besides swimming there were titles contested in open water swimming, diving, synchronized swimming (women) and – for the last time – water polo.

The swimming championships resulted in two European records: Ágnes Kovács on the women's 200 m breaststroke and Russia in the men's 4×100 m freestyle relay. Alexander Popov returned in competition after being stabbed down in Moscow, shortly after the 1996 Summer Olympics in Atlanta, Georgia.

Medal table

Swimming

Men's events

Women's events

Open water swimming

Men's events

Women's events

Diving

Men's events

Women's events

Synchronized swimming

Water polo

Men's team event

Women's team event

External links
Results
LEN European Aquatics Championships at SVT's open archive (including 1997 event) 

 
LEN European Aquatics Championships
European Aquatics Championships, 1997
S
European 1997
Sports competitions in Seville
August 1997 sports events in Europe
20th century in Seville